Healy v. James, 408 U.S. 169 (1972), was a United States Supreme Court case in which the Court held that Central Connecticut State College's refusal to recognize a campus chapter of Students for a Democratic Society was unconstitutional.  The denial of official recognition was found to violate the First Amendment.

The crux of the ruling was that the onus was on the college to provide valid reasons for denial, rather than insisting that the organization provide evidence that their recognition would not be harmful.

External links
 
 

United States Supreme Court cases
United States Supreme Court cases of the Burger Court
United States Free Speech Clause case law
1972 in United States case law